The 2006 Missouri Valley Conference men's soccer season was the 16th season of men's varsity soccer in the conference.

The 2006 Missouri Valley Conference Men's Soccer Tournament was hosted by Bradley and won by Creighton.

Teams

MVC Tournament

See also 

 Missouri Valley Conference
 Missouri Valley Conference men's soccer tournament
 2006 NCAA Division I men's soccer season
 2006 in American soccer

References 

Missouri Valley Conference
2006 NCAA Division I men's soccer season